The Fenelon Place Elevator (also known as the Fourth Street Elevator) is a  narrow gauge funicular railway located in Dubuque, Iowa, United States. It was listed in the National Register of Historic Places in 1978.  It was included as a contributing property in the Cathedral Historic District in 1985, and in the Fenelon Place Residential Historic District in 2015.

History

A predecessor to the Fourth Street Elevator was built in 1882 for the private use of local banker and former state senator J.K. Graves.  The funicular was opened to the public in 1884, charging 5 cents per ride.  After several fires, the current funicular was built in 1893 on the footprint of the 1882 incline; the 1893 funicular inaugurated the use of the cable car technology that continues in use today.

Location
The upper station of the elevator is located at 512 Fenelon Place, whilst the lower station is located at the western end of Fourth Street. At the top, there are two observation decks, which offer a commanding view of the downtown Dubuque area. The states of Iowa, Illinois, and Wisconsin can all be seen from the observation decks.

Function
The two cars start at opposite ends, passing each other at the midpoint of the elevator. The two cars counterbalance each other, drawing motive power from an engine in the station house at the top of the hill. The engine only needs to overcome inertia and friction and compensate for the varying weight of the passengers in the cars.

The Fourth Street Elevator is run from April 1 to November 30. The hours are from 8 am to 10 pm.

Gallery

See also 
 List of funicular railways

References

External links

Fenelon Place Elevator Company web site
Easton's Article web site - production used the Fenelon Place Elevator as a featured movie location in December 2010

3 ft gauge railways in the United States
Culture of Dubuque, Iowa
Buildings and structures in Dubuque, Iowa
Funicular railways in the United States
National Register of Historic Places in Dubuque, Iowa
Passenger rail transportation in Iowa
Transportation in Dubuque, Iowa
Tourist attractions in Dubuque, Iowa
1882 establishments in Iowa
Cableways on the National Register of Historic Places
Rail infrastructure on the National Register of Historic Places in Iowa
Individually listed contributing properties to historic districts on the National Register in Iowa